Eau Claire Transit is the provider of mass transportation in Eau Claire County, Wisconsin. Ten routes are served by a fleet of 22 low-floored buses. Service in all routes is provided in thirty-minute or one-hour headways.

Routes
All except the University routes make layover stops at the Transfer Center in downtown Eau Claire.
Routes 12, 15, 17 and 18 share a bus with routes 2, 5, 7 and 8 respectively; these routes alternate on the half-hour, making stops downtown at :15 and :45. Routes 20 and 21 alternate in a similar fashion. The other routes stop at the Transfer Center once per hour at either :15 or :45.
1 Margaret & Mall
2 Mt. Washington
12 Delong
3 North High School
4 Locust Lane
5 Rudolph Road
15 West MacArthur 
6 Putnam Heights & Mall
7 West Clairemont
17 Altoona
8 Folsom & Vine
18 Memorial High School
9 University: Water Street and Stein Blvd.
20 Westridge Center
21 Shopko Plaza
On evenings and Saturdays, a combination route 3/4 serves both the North High School and Locust Lane areas.

University routes
Two routes, both numbered 9, serve the University of Wisconsin-Eau Claire campus. The Water Street route serves the Water Street area and downtown, while the Stein Blvd. route runs through upper campus and the dorms.

These routes have layovers in front of Kjer Theatre every 20 minutes rather than at the Transit Center. The Water Street bus stops briefly at the Transfer Center for those who need to transfer.

Other routes also serve parts of campus. 2 and 7 run on Water Street, while 15, 6, 7 and 21 pass campus on State Street. All city bus routes are free to UWEC students. Routes vary in the evenings and on Saturdays; there is no service on Sundays.

Eau Claire Transit Center

Until 2021, Eau Claire Transit had been operating out of a 1985 transit center, which had been planned as a temporary location until a permanent transit center could be built. However, this arrangement lasted for 36 years. In 2018, the city was awarded a $5 million Transportation Investment Generating Economic Recovery (TIGER) grant for the project by the US Department of Transportation.

The new transit center began construction on September 17, 2021 on the same site as the "temporary" 1985 transit center. In order to provide a transfer facility during construction, a temporary facility was built at South Farwell Street and Gray Street, just east of the current site, on a surface parking lot. This site opened on September 2, and will be in use until the new transit center is complete in fall 2022. This site and the new transit center will both have dedicated bus bays for each route, a first for Eau Claire.

The new transit center will feature restrooms, a heated and airconditioned lobby, offices for transit supervisors and retail space on the ground floor, two stories of parking above, and three stories of affordable housing on top. The 50 to 60 apartments above are intended to be “workforce housing,” meaning the rent will be affordable for those making between 80% and 120% of the median county income. The city originally partnered with the developer Merge Urban Development Group on the project, however the developer backed out in late 2021 and Impact Seven, a Rice Lake-based nonprofit that specializes in developing and managing affordable housing took over.  Due to this change, the housing will be less affordable, but still below the area median income.

The new transit center will be complete in fall 2022, however the whole project, including parking and housing will not be finished until 2023.  Due to the high construction costs in 2021 and 2022, the city must contribute $9.55 million to the project instead of the original $1.25 million. An estimate from 2019 had estimated the value of the project at $23.5 million.

Ridership

See also
 List of intercity bus stops in Wisconsin
 List of bus transit systems in the United States

References

External links
Official site

Companies based in Eau Claire, Wisconsin
Bus transportation in Wisconsin